Lăcrămioara Filip (-Moldovan) (born 4 April 1973 Romania) is a retired Romanian artistic and aerobic gymnast. She is a world silver medalist with the team (artistic gymnastics) and a European gold medalist on the group event (aerobic gymnastics). She is also known to be the first gymnast to perform a tucked double front dismount from the uneven bars. Currently she is a gymnastics coach at the Romanian National Olimpic Center in Deva where she trains the national juniors team.

Artistic gymnastics career
She started to train for artistic gymnastics at the National Olympic Center in Oneşti. Her debut at an international event was at the 1988 "Junior Friendship" meet (Druzhba) where she placed second with the team, fifth all around and second on vault. In 1989 she was a member of the silver medaled team at the world championships. The other team members were Cristina Bontaș, Aurelia Dobre, Eugenia Popa, Gabriela Potorac and Daniela Silivaş. She placed 5th on vault and 28th all around at the 1990 Cottbus Cup and won bronze all around behind Lavinia Miloșovici and Maria Neculiţă at the 1991 Romanian International. She retired from artistic gymnastics after 1991.

Aerobic gymnastics career
In the years after retirement Lăcrămioara transferred to aerobic gymnastics. She trained at the C.S Farul Constanta club with coach Maria Fumea. In 1999 she won the gold medal for the group event at the European Championships and together with her partner Claudiu Moldovan placed fourth on the mixed pair event at the world championships. She also performed in the Aeros entertainment show. Among her colleagues at Aeros were Daniela Mărănduca, Izabela Lăcătuș, Cristian Claudiu Moldovan and Remus Nicolai.

Post retirement
Lăcrămioara married her aerobic gymnastics and Aeros colleague Cristian Claudiu Moldovan in 2001. Together they have a daughter Teodora Paula(born 2004). In 2000, she became a gymnastics coach at Dinamo Club Bucharest.Currently, she is coaching together with her husband at the Olympic Center Deva. Among many gymnast she coached young Diana Chelaru, Diana Bulimar and Larisa Iordache.

References

External links
 List of competitive results at Gymn Forum

1973 births
Living people
Romanian female artistic gymnasts
Romanian aerobic gymnasts
Female aerobic gymnasts
Medalists at the World Artistic Gymnastics Championships
European champions in gymnastics
People from Moinești